Sightings: Heartland Ghost is a 2002 film that originally aired on Showtime based on the TV series Sightings and inspired by true events. The film was written by Phil Penningroth and directed by Brian Trenchard-Smith.

Plot
In this creepy ghost story, a Kansas couple's claim that their Victorian house is haunted prompts a visit from the crew of "Sightings", a TV show exploring paranormal events. Nobody believes the couple's story - especially cynical producer Derek (Beau Bridges), but show psychic Allen (Miguel Ferrer) begins feeling the presence of several entities, including a little girl.

Cast
Beau Bridges as Derek
Nia Long as Lou
Miguel Ferrer as Allen
Gabriel Olds as Jeff
Thea Gill as Pam
Matthew Currie Holmes as Nolan
Rachel Hayward as Jamie
Trevor Roberts as Arnold

Original segments
The following are the original Sightings episodes to feature the Heartland Ghost recurring segments.

Releases
The film aired on Showtime on October 27, 2002 and released on DVD on March 2, 2004.

References

External links

2002 horror films
2002 films
American horror television films
Showtime (TV network) films
Films directed by Brian Trenchard-Smith
2000s American films